Alex Weir was a Scottish-American soccer defender who played in the second American Soccer League from 1936 to 1949.  He is a member of the National Soccer Hall of Fame.

Weir moved to the United States when he was nineteen and spent thirteen seasons in the American Soccer League.   Weir was the captain of St. Mary's Celtic when it finished runner-up to Chicago Sparta in the 1938 National Challenge Cup.  In 1944, he played for the Brooklyn Wanderers.  In 1975, he was inducted into the National Soccer Hall of Fame.

References

American soccer players
American Soccer League (1933–1983) players
Brooklyn St. Mary's Celtic players
New York Brookhattan players
National Soccer Hall of Fame members
Association football defenders
Year of birth missing